Hugh Swinton Legaré (January 2, 1797 – June 20, 1843) was an American lawyer and politician.

Life and career
Legaré was born in Charleston, South Carolina, of Huguenot and Scottish ancestry.

Partly due to his inability to share in the amusements of his fellows, as a result of a vaccine-related deformity suffered before he was five that permanently stunted the growth and development of his legs; Legaré was an eager student and was president of the Clariosophic Society at the College of South Carolina (now University of South Carolina at Columbia), from which he graduated in 1814 with the highest rank in his class and with a reputation for scholarship and eloquence.

After graduation, he studied the law for three years, did advanced work in Paris and Edinburgh in 1818 and 1819 and in 1822 was admitted to the South Carolina bar.

After practicing for a time in Charleston, he became a member of the South Carolina House of Representatives, serving between 1820 and 1821 and then again between 1824 and 1830. He also founded and edited the Southern Review between 1828 and 1832.

From 1830 until 1832 he was the Attorney General of South Carolina, and he supported states' rights, he strongly opposed nullification. He was Attorney General until he was appointed chargé d'affaires to Brussels in 1832, serving there until 1836. In 1838, he was elected as a member to the American Philosophical Society.

On his return he was elected to the 25th Congress as a Democrat, but failed in a re-election bid the following term. In 1841 President John Tyler named him Attorney General of the United States and he served in that office until his death. He also served as Secretary of State ad interim from May 8, 1843, until his death.

He died in Boston while attending ceremonies for the unveiling of the Bunker Hill Monument. He was first interred in Mount Auburn Cemetery in Cambridge, Massachusetts, and was later re-interred in Magnolia Cemetery in Charleston. The USCGC Legare, which is a medium endurance cutter, was named in his honor.

See also
James Matthews Legaré

References

Sources

Further reading
 The Writings of Hugh Swinton Legaré, South Carolina, 1846. (2 vols.)
Hollis, Daniel Walker (1951) University of South Carolina, volume I: South Carolina College, Columbia: University of South Carolina Press.

External links
 

1797 births
1843 deaths
Democratic Party members of the South Carolina House of Representatives
South Carolina Attorneys General
United States Attorneys General
Ambassadors of the United States to Belgium
University of South Carolina alumni
American people of French descent
American people of Scottish descent
Politicians from Charleston, South Carolina
Tyler administration cabinet members
19th-century American diplomats
Democratic Party members of the United States House of Representatives from South Carolina
19th-century American politicians
Lawyers from Charleston, South Carolina
Acting United States Secretaries of State
Burials at Mount Auburn Cemetery
Burials at Magnolia Cemetery (Charleston, South Carolina)